Barbosa is a town in the Santander Department in northeastern Colombia. Municipality of the province of Vélez.

Called by the natives of the region as "The Golden Gate of Santander", being the second Santander municipality by the southern entrance of the department.

History 
Founding Date: May 24, 1539

Founder's name: Heliodoro Barbosa

Barbosa called "Puerta de oro de Santander", its privileged geographical location, its colorful valley on the banks of the Suarez River, has allowed it to become the nerve center of an extensive region and the roads that converge in it have made it an obligatory one of the most powerful municipalities in the department.

His first embryo was the Center populated of Cite, today its corregimiento, founded by Martín Galeano the 24 of May 1539 (it is considered the first population founded in the department of Santander since Vélez was founded on July 3, 1539) and for many years it held the category of municipality, he first came to the legal life on October 1, 1939 precisely as a corregimiento attached to Our Lady of Cite, but its unusual development, especially caused by its rapid growth of business led to the Assembly of the department to approve ordinance No. 42 of June 21, 1940, turning it into a municipal seat.

Its name is a tribute to the Spanish general Heliodoro Barbosa, who fought relentlessly against the Ubazas Indians, settlers of the region and who are said to be the most accurate macana archery marksmen.

Conquest and colonization 
The main original nuclei existing by the lands crossed by Martín Galeano are the following: Agataes, with Chipatá as head, and the clans and rancherios in Guavatá, Ubasá, Güepsa and some other points: Yariguíes or Lloriquíes, watered by the mountainous area that extends long behind Vélez to the north; the Guanes and Chanchones by the oriental margin of the Sarabita River and slopes of the Mochuelo or Fonce; and something more to the east the Chalalaes or Charalás.
Neither one nor the other was concentrated in large populations. They were clans or family groups scattered here and there, with dialects and customs often dissimilar. For that reason Galeano and its people took a slip when they undertook their campaign, they thought to find great towns and a lot of gentility, at the end they only found a few groups and tough fighters.

Arrival of the conquerors 
The conquistadors set foot on these lands for the first time in the year of 1539, when the conqueror Martín Galeano, following the orders of   Don Gonzalo Jiménez de Quesada, visited the Santanderean mountains in which he had to find some similar to those of Vélez (Spain). Martín Galeano, after having passed through different Guanes territories and fought several battles with the Indians, in May 1539 camped on the banks of the Suarez River where today is Cite. The mission was to found the city of Vélez, but circumstances did not allow and after citing several names for this camp they managed to reach an agreement and called it Cite. The soldiers encamped in this place, exhausted by fatigue, began to wonder the name that they would put saying ... "Partner Cite yourself a name, Cite yourself a name"

The region was inhabited by the Ubasas Indians who were said to be the most accurate arrow shooters with bow and its name of Barbosa is due to the name of Captain Helidoro Barbosa, who fought an intense battle with the tribe and fought relentlessly, in which the Spaniards were on the verge of succumbing and after several days of intense battles they were victorious, for that reason Martín Galeano, in recognition of the value demonstrated by the commander, commanded to raise a bridge on the Suarez river which he called precisely "Puente Barbosa" , planting this name for the first time in the region.
Among the first inhabitants of Barbosa who sat his plant in these rich regions are the families of surnames Becaría, Camacho, Escamilla, Ulloa, Moncada, Chaparro, Fajardo, Cely, Ríos and González.

Geography 
Geographical review

The municipality of Barbosa is located in the extreme south of the Department of Santander, in limits with the department of Boyacá, in the province of Vélez and Ricaurte, on the banks of the Suarez River between the mountains that make up the Eastern Cordillera, at a distance of the capital of the country of 190 km and of Bucaramanga to 214 km. Territorially it has a strategic location on the main national paved road No. 45 that connects Bogota with Bucaramanga, so Barbosa is known as the "Puerta de Oro de Santander".
The municipal capital of Barbosa is located on the left bank of the Suarez River, it has the following coordinates at 05 ° 55 '57 "North latitude and 73 ° 37' 16" longitude west of the Greenwich meridian. The total area of the Municipality is 46.43 km2, of which correspond to the rural area that are distributed between 1588 meters above sea level, basically in the extreme north of the territory, on the Suárez River, and 2050 meters above sea level in limits with Vélez, Güepsa.

Limits of the municipality

Barbosa limits by the north, with the municipality of Güepsa; by the south with the municipality of National Bridge, by the east with the Suárez river and the municipality of Moniquirá (Boyacá) and by the west with the municipalities of Vélez and Guavatá. With Vélez, it limits along the blade of Santa Rosa, in a length of 7.5 km; towards the southwestern end, with Guavatá in about half a kilometer, in the south with Puente Nacional along the Semiza creek, in a three and a half kilometer route, until its affluence with the Suárez river. From there, with the Suarez River in between, it borders the department of Boyacá, which, at the height of the Liberty Bridge, on the national highway (Tunja-Bucaramanga), describes a wide north-facing arch. The length of the eastern boundary on the bank is about 14.3 km.
The municipality of Barbosa communicates with Bogota through the National Bridge, Chiquinquirá, a paved road for the most part and begins the transversal of Carare (Puerto Berrío, on the Magdalena River). It also has an airport, useful for twin-engine aviation equipment.
Total extension: 46.43 km²

Climate

The climate is tropical in Barbosa. There is significant rainfall throughout the year in Barbosa. The climate classification of Köppen-Geiger is Af. The average annual temperature in Barbosa is 72 °F. The rainfall is 87 inches per year. Between the hottest months of the year we find from January to March with an average temperature of 77 °F. The coldest month of the year is December with a temperature of 69 °F.

References

Municipalities of Santander Department